Kazimierz Zarankiewicz (2 May 1902 – 5 September 1959) was a Polish mathematician and Professor at the Warsaw University of Technology who was interested primarily in topology and graph theory.

Biography

Zarankiewicz was born in Częstochowa to father Stanisław and mother Józefa (née Borowska). He studied at the University of Warsaw, together with Zygmunt Janiszewski, Stefan Mazurkiewicz, Wacław Sierpiński, Kazimierz Kuratowski, and Stanisław Saks.

During World War II, Zarankiewicz took part in illegal teaching, forbidden by the German authorities, and eventually was sent to a concentration camp. He survived and became a teacher at Warsaw University of Technology (Polish: Politechnika Warszawska).

He visited universities in Tomsk, Harvard, London, and Vienna.  He served as president of the Warsaw section of the Polish Mathematical Society and the International Astronautical Federation.

He died in London, England.

Research contributions
Zarankiewicz wrote works on cut-points in connected spaces, on conformal mappings, on complex functions and number theory, and triangular numbers.

The Zarankiewicz problem is named after Zarankiewicz. This problem asks, for a given size of (0,1)-matrix, how many matrix entries must be set equal to 1 in order to guarantee that the matrix contains at least one a × b submatrix is made up only of 1's. An equivalent formulation in extremal graph theory asks for the maximum number of edges in a bipartite graph with no complete bipartite subgraph Ka,b.

The Zarankiewicz crossing number conjecture in the mathematical field of graph theory is also named after Zarankiewicz. The conjecture states that the crossing number of a complete bipartite graph  equals

Zarankiewicz proved that this formula is an upper bound for the actual crossing number. The problem of determining the number  was suggested by Paul Turán and became known as Turán's brick factory problem.

See also
List of Polish mathematicians

References

External links

 

20th-century  Polish  mathematicians
Topologists
University of Warsaw alumni
Academic staff of the Warsaw University of Technology
Nazi concentration camp survivors
People from Częstochowa
1902 births
1959 deaths